The third season of The Fosters premiered on June 8, 2015 and ended on March 28, 2016. The season consisted of 20 episodes and stars Teri Polo and Sherri Saum as Stef Foster and Lena Adams, an interracial lesbian couple, who foster a girl (Maia Mitchell) and her younger brother (Hayden Byerly) while also trying to juggle raising Latino twin teenagers (Cierra Ramirez and Noah Centineo) and Stef's biological son (David Lambert).

Premise 
In this season, 3 weeks has passed and  the family deals with the aftermath of the terrible car accident involving Mariana, Jesus, and Ana. Now that Callie is officially a member of the Adams Foster's home, she is feeling secure for the first time in a long time and determined to have a summer of free-spirited fun, including trying her best to get over Brandon. Meanwhile, Brandon is going to Idyllwild Music Program, where he will be faced with serious competition. Jude and Connor continue to develop their relationship and what it means to be a young teen exploring new love. Stef and Lena continue to face challenges as a couple and as parents yet are determined to fight through them together.

Cast

Main cast
 Teri Polo as Stef Adams Foster
 Sherri Saum as Lena Adams Foster
 Maia Mitchell as Callie Adams Foster
 Noah Centineo as Jesus Adams Foster
 Cierra Ramirez as Mariana Adams Foster
 David Lambert as Brandon Foster
 Hayden Byerly as Jude Adams Foster
 Danny Nucci as Mike Foster

Recurring cast
 Tom Williamson as AJ Hensdale
 Chris Warren Jr. as Ty Hensdale
 Jordan Rodrigues as Mat Tan
 Denyse Tontz as Cortney Strathmore
 Brandon Quinn as Gabriel Duncroft
 Louis Hunter as Nick Stratos
 Alexandra Barreto as Ana Gutierrez
 Marlene Forte as Elena Gutierrez
 Tony Plana as Victor Gutierrez
 Yvette Monreal as Adriana Gutierrez
 Gavin MacIntosh as Connor Stevens
 Chris Bruno as Adam Stevens
 Daffany Clark as Daphne Keene
 Alicia Sixtos as Carmen
 Cherinda Kincherlow as Kiara
 Annika Marks as Monte Porter
 Keean Johnson as Tony
 Alberto De Diego as Rafael
 Bianca A. Santos as Lexi Rivera
 Kelli Williams as Justina Marks
 Annie Potts as Sharon Elkin
 Rob Morrow as Will
 Rosie O'Donnell as Rita Hendricks

Guest cast
 Lorraine Toussaint as Dana Adams
 Bruce Davison as Stuart Adams
 Travis Schuldt as Nathan Adams
 Kerr Smith as Robert Quinn
 Bailee Madison as Sophia Quinn
 Valerie Dillman as Jill Quinn
 Suzanne Cryer as Jenna Paul
 Amanda Leighton as Emma
 Jamie McShane as Donald Jacob
 Madisen Beaty as Talya Banks
 Ashley Argota as Lou Chan
 Alex Saxon as Wyatt
 Garrett Clayton as Chase Dillon
 Corbin Bleu as Mercutio
 Madison Pettis as Daria 
 Izabela Vidovic as Taylor
 Tom Phelan as Cole
 Annamarie Kenoyer as Becka

Episodes

Production

Casting
In March 2015, it was announced that Jake T. Austin would be leaving the show. He tweeted: "I'm honored to have been a part of such a groundbreaking series, but I personally want to let you know that my time on the show has come to an end. Thank you for letting me be a part of your family, it's been a pleasure." It was announced three months later that Noah Centineo would replace Austin in the role of Jesus.

References

2015 American television seasons 
2016 American television seasons
The Fosters (American TV series)